Annunziata is the Italian word for (feminine) Annunciation. It is generally understood to refer to the Virgin Mary, receiving the word of the Angel Gabriel that she is to bear the Christ child; that is, the Virgin Mary after the Annunciation. It is a common theme for iconic reverence in Roman Catholicism (see Immaculate Conception).
In Catholic families where all the children are girls it is sometimes given to a new child in the hope that the next born will be a boy.

Notable people with the name include:

Given name
Annunziata Dell'Olio (born 1961), Italian-British lawyer
Annunziata Rees-Mogg (born 1979), English freelance journalist, and MEP for the East Midlands
Nancy Pelosi (born 1940 as Annunciata Patricia "Nancy" D'Alesandro), Speaker of the United States House of Representatives.
Princess Maria Annunciata of Bourbon-Two Sicilies (1843–1871), mother of Archduke Franz Ferdinand

Surname
Christina Annunziata, American medical oncologist
Lucia Annunziata (born 1950), Italian journalist
Sandy Annunziata (born 1969), former offensive guard and Center in the Canadian Football League
Xavier Annunziata (born 1987), Spanish football player

See also
 Santissima Annunziata (disambiguation)

Italian feminine given names
Italian-language surnames